Limitation may refer to:

 Limitation Act, a list of legislation in Malaysia and the United Kingdom
 A statute of limitations
 Limitations (novel), a 2006 novel by Scott Turow
 A disclaimer for research done in an experiment or study

See also
 
 Limit (disambiguation)